Bokariadi is one of a number of towns in Guinea with this name.  This is the one in the south east of the country near the border with Sierra Leone.

Elevation 

 Elevation = 144m
 Elevation2 = 165.76m

References 

Populated places in Guinea